Frederick is a city in Rice County, Kansas, United States.  As of the 2020 census, the population of the city was 8.

History

Frederick was incorporated in 1909.  It was a shipping point at the junction of the Missouri Patfic and the St. Louis & San Francisco railroads.

A post office was opened in Frederick (also spelled historically Frederic) in 1887, and remained in operation until it was discontinued in 1954.

In July 2015, Government officials report considering un-incorporating the city.  As of August 2015, for the first time in nearly 130 years, the city doesn't have a city council and no one ran for mayor in April 2015. The future of Frederick is uncertain because Rice County doesn't have the power to unincorporate the city. According to state law, residents must bring a petition to the city council, then a special election will be called for a vote, but since there isn't a city council then it can't happen.

In November 2016, the community voted on whether dissolve Frederick.  Election workers at the Eureka Township voting location accidentally made a mistake by giving the wrong ballots to township residents who didn't actually live in Frederick.  20 people voted, 13 voted to keep the community alive, but currently only 9 people live in Frederick.  The mistake was caught more than a week after the vote was certified, which is after the 5 day window to contest a vote, thus Kansas Law locked the outcome, Frederick is still a city.

In November 2017, another ballot issue was voted on whether to dissolve the city.  The vote was 2-2.

Geography
Frederick is located at  (38.513108, -98.267756).

Demographics

2010 census
As of the census of 2010, there were 18 people, 8 households, and 6 families residing in the city. The racial makeup of the city was 100.0% White.

There were 8 households, of which 25.0% had children under the age of 18 living with them, 75.0% were married couples living together, and 25.0% were non-families. 25.0% of all households were made up of individuals, and 12.5% had someone living alone who was 65 years of age or older. The average household size was 2.25 and the average family size was 2.67.

The median age in the city was 48.5 years. 22.2% of residents were under the age of 18; 0.0% were between the ages of 18 and 24; 22.2% were from 25 to 44; 50.1% were from 45 to 64; and 5.6% were 65 years of age or older. The gender makeup of the city was 50.0% male and 50.0% female.

2000 census
As of the census of 2000, there were 11 people, 7 households, and 3 families residing in the city. The racial makeup of the city was 100.00% White.

There were 7 households, out of which none had children under the age of 18 living with them, 57.1% were married couples living together, and 42.9% were non-families. 42.9% of all households were made up of individuals, and 14.3% had someone living alone who was 65 years of age or older. The average household size was 1.57 and the average family size was 2.00.

In the city, the population was spread out, with 54.5% from 45 to 64, and 45.5% who were 65 years of age or older. The median age was 54 years. For every 100 females, there were 120.0 males. For every 100 females age 18 and over, there were 120.0 males.

The median income for a household in the city was $46,250, and the median income for a family was $46,250. Males had a median income of $19,375 versus $26,250 for females. The per capita income for the city was $20,845. None of the population and none of the families were below the poverty line.

Education
The community is served by Central Plains USD 112 public school district.

References

Further reading

External links
 Frederick - Directory of Public Officials
 Frederick city map, KDOT

Cities in Kansas
Cities in Rice County, Kansas